Captain William Boyd Elliott was a World War I flying ace credited with five aerial victories.

Honours and awards citations
Distinguished Flying Cross (DFC)

Lieut. (T./Capt.) William Boyd Elliott.

This officer has taken part in one hundred bombing raids, in the majority of which he has been leader, a position for which he has the essential qualities in a marked degree. viz., courage, resolution, and resource. While leading one bombing raid his formation was attacked by thirty hostile machines; ten of these were destroyed, the objective was successfully bombed, and the formation returned without the loss of a machine. This brilliant success was mainly due to Captain Elliott's skilful leadership.

Supplement to the London Gazette, 2 November 1918 (30989/12964)

Sources of information

References

1898 births
1979 deaths
People from St. Catharines
Canadian World War I flying aces
Recipients of the Distinguished Flying Cross (United Kingdom)